Equus occidentalis (commonly known as the western horse) was a Pleistocene species of horse, now extinct, that inhabited North America, specifically the Southwestern United States.

It was a stoutly built animal and resembled the extinct quagga or the modern plains zebra, although it was not a close relative to either of these.

References

Prehistoric mammals of North America
Equus (genus)
Taxa named by Richard Owen
Fossil taxa described in 1863